Where's Wally? (called Where's Waldo? in Canada and the USA) is a British series of children's puzzle books created by English illustrator Martin Handford. The books consist of a series of detailed double-page spread illustrations depicting dozens or more people doing a variety of amusing things at a given location. Readers are challenged to find a character named Wally hidden in the group.

Wally is identified by his red-and-white-striped shirt, bobble hat, and glasses, but many illustrations contain red herrings involving deceptive use of red-and-white striped objects. Later entries in the long-running book series added other targets for readers to find in each illustration. The books have also inspired two television programmes (Where's Wally? the 1991 animated series and Where's Wally? the 2019 animated series), a comic strip and a series of video games.

, more than 73 million books of Where's Wally? (and his regional names) had been sold around the world since his original publication in 1987. The series of pictorial puzzle books has been translated into 26 languages, and is published in over 50 countries.

History
In 1986, illustrator Martin Handford, a graduate of the University for the Creative Arts in Kent, was asked by his art director, David Bennett, at Walker Books in London to develop a book of detailed crowd scenes, inspired by Bennett having seen Philippe Dupasquier's Busy Places series. Whilst the book was being prepared for Bologna Book Fair, someone at Walker Books suggested the idea of adding a distinctive-looking character whom the reader could search for in the crowd scenes. After much thinking, Handford came up with the idea of "Wally", a world traveller and time travel aficionado who always dresses in red and white. Sometimes it would take him up to eight weeks to draw a two-page sketch of the elusive "Wally" and the characters surrounding him.

The first Where's Wally? book was published on 21 September 1987. Where's Wally? books were published in the United Kingdom by Walker Books and in the United States under the title Where's Waldo? first by Little, Brown and Company before being taken on by Candlewick Press (Walker Books' American subsidiary publishing company). The first four titles were originally printed in Italy, but later reprinted in China.

The books became extremely popular and were localised for many different territories, with name changes for Wally in certain regions. The franchise also spawned other media in a more storyline-based form, including a 1991 television series, Where's Wally?, a comic strip, Where's Wally? and a series of video games.

As the series goes on, Wally progressively becomes harder to find, reducing his size on the page and surrounding him by more characters. In the first book, Wally was on average  big. He has also been surrounded by more characters, from 225 on the first book's first page to about 850 on the last book's first page.

Characters

 Wally, whose name was localised for certain international editions, for example Waldo in North American editions. Over time, more characters were added to find in each scene.
 Wilma, Wally's friend first appeared in the Ultimate Fun Book, and was replaced by her identical twin sister Wenda in the Where's Wally: The Magnificent Poster Book.
 Wenda, a friend of Wally who replaced her twin sister Wilma for In Hollywood (although she previously appeared in The Magnificent Poster Book).
 Odlaw, Wally's nemesis, who made his print debut in The Magnificent Poster Book. He appears nearly the same as Wally, except that his clothes are yellow and black striped instead of red and white; his glasses have a blue tint to them; and he has a moustache. He also has a British accent in the television series. Although it is told that "his bad deeds are many", he is not depicted in the books doing anything particularly nasty. However, in the television series, he is frequently seen to be attempting to steal Wally's magical walking stick. His name "Odlaw" is simply a reversal of "Waldo" from the American editions, although he is still called "Odlaw" in the United Kingdom as well. In the reboot, he is reimagined as Odlulu, a misunderstood pre teen female Anti-Wanderer designed as a fusion between Wenda, Wilma, and Odlaw's traditional designs. She sports a yellow baseball cap with black stripes and glasses with angular black frames, and shoulder-length black hair with a yellow streak. She wears a long-sleeved black and yellow top, and a yellow skirt, knee-high black socks with white cuffs and blue shoes.
 Woof, Wally's dog, first appeared in The Ultimate Fun Book, where he was identified as Wenda's dog. Only his tail can be found, with the exception of the final page of Where's Wally: The Wonder Book, which depicts all of Woof, and the six activity books released between 1993 and 1995, starting with The Truly Terrific Activity Book, where Woof shows himself to the reader. In the 2019 TV series, Woof is replaced by Arfolomew, a dog also known as Arf for short. Woof later returns to the new series.
 Wizard Whitebeard, first seen in The Fantastic Journey. His signature is his exceptionally long beard, which is often the key to finding him. In his first appearance, he was responsible for sending Wally on a quest to discover the truth about himself, and he has tagged along on Wally's travels ever since. His appearance in The Ultimate Fun Book, however, is in only one scene in "Old Friends" and his presence is unmentioned in the book and acts as one of the background characters.
 The Wally Watchers are Wally's devoted fan-club that first appeared in Where's Wally? The Ultimate Fun Book (1990). They turn up wherever Wally goes, dressed in the same red-and-white striped outfit. While 25 appear in most books, there are in comparison, 99 of them in the Ultimate Fun Book.
 In the earlier books, a character appears in every scene, which the reader must look to find out who it is. This is because no information on the characters is given in the books aside from the task to look for them. The characters appeared as background characters and all had something unique to them, like blonde hair or a ginger beard. In some cases, characters from previous scenes would also appear.
 Fritz, a hungry ferret who is Odlulu's companion who also appeared in the new series.

International editions

In international editions, Wally has often been given a name in the local language:

 Afrikaans: 
 American English: 
 Arabic:  (Fuḍūlī)
 Bulgarian:  (Uoli)
 Catalan: 
 Chinese: 
 Cantonese pronunciation: Wai1 lei6
 Mandarin pronunciation: Wēilì
 Croatian: 
 Czech: 
 Danish: 
 Dutch: 
 Egyptian Arabic:  (shalabee)
 Estonian: 
 Esperanto: 
 Finnish: 
 French: 
 Galician: 
 German: 
 Georgian:  (Voli)
 Greek:  (Gouόli)
 Hebrew:  (Efi)
 Hindi:  (Heṭṭi)
 Hungarian: 
 Icelandic: 
 Italian: , 
 Japanese:  (Wōrī)
 Korean:  (Walli)
 Lithuanian: 
 Norwegian: 
 Polish: 
 Portuguese: 
 Romanian: 
 Russian:  (Uolli)
 Serbian:  (Gile)
 Spanish: 
 Turkish: , 
 Welsh: 

Some examples of the full book names in other countries include:

 Waar's Willie? (Afrikaans)
 أين شلبي؟ (Arabic)
 Kъде е Уоли? (Bulgarian)
 On és Wally? (Catalan)
  (Chinese)
 Gdje je Jura? (Croatian)
 Kde je Valdík? (Czech)
 Find Holger (Danish)
 Waar is Wally? (Dutch)
 Missä Vallu? (Finnish)
 Où est Charlie? (French)
 ¿Onde está Wally? (Galician)
 Wo ist Walter? (German)
 Που είναι ο Γουόλι; (Greek)
  (Hebrew)
 Hová tűnt Vili? (Hungarian)
 Hvar er Valli? (Icelandic)
 Dimana Waldo? (Indonesian)
 Ubaldo dove sei? (Italian)
  (Japanese)
  (Korean)
 Surask Joną! (Lithuanian)
 Kemana Wally? (Malay)
 Hvor er Willy? (Norwegian)
 Gdzie jest Wally? (Polish)
 Onde está Wally? (Brazilian Portuguese)
 Onde está o Wally? (European Portuguese)
 Unde-i Wally? (Romanian)
 Где Уолли? (Russian)
 Gde je Gile? (Serbian)
 ¿Dónde está Wally? (Spanish)
 Var är Waldo? (Swedish)
 Ali nerede? (Turkish)
 Ble mae Wali? (Welsh)

Media

Books

Primary books
, there are seven primary Wally books. The books were released both in hard-cover (for the original books) and subsequently in paperback. Each contains around a dozen scenes with Wally hidden in them. Each book has additional hidden objects and/or characters hidden in each scene specific to that book. The books usually reserve telling the reader about some item(s) to find until the end of the book so that the reader will have to go through the book again. The books contain checklists for each scene of interesting things or people to find.

 Where's Wally? (US title: Where's Waldo?) (1987)
 Where's Wally Now? (US title: Find Waldo Now, renamed Where's Waldo Now? later) (1988)
 Where's Wally? The Fantastic Journey (US title: The Great Waldo Search, renamed Where's Waldo? The Fantastic Journey later) (1989)
 Where's Wally in Hollywood? (US title: Where's Waldo in Hollywood?) (1993)
 Where's Wally? The Wonder Book (US title: Where's Waldo? The Wonder Book) (1997)
 Where's Wally? The Great Picture Hunt! (US title: Where's Waldo? The Great Picture Hunt!) (2006)
 Where's Wally? The Incredible Paper Chase (US title: Where's Waldo? The Incredible Paper Chase) (2009)

There have been three rounds of revised editions. In 1993, to coincide with the publication of In Hollywood, the first three books were reprinted with Wenda, Woof and the Wally Watchers added to the original illustrations, and the books were numbered on the cover. A "pocket edition" of the first book was also published, in a tiny A6 format. Wally is even harder to spot when shrunk to this degree, and later printings included a free magnifying lens.

In 1997, to coincide with the publication of The Wonder Book, special "Tenth Anniversary Editions" of the first four books were published with a distinct silver border on their front covers, and added later-introduced characters and objects to look for in every scene, and also moved Wally to different locations from the original versions. These special editions appeared in both standard and "pocket" formats.

In 2007, for the 20th anniversary of the first book, the special editions of 1997 (and The Great Picture Hunt) were re-released with a new cover into paperback format. The silver borders on the books were removed and instead, the books were numbered in the top left-hand corner of the cover. Aside from the new numbering system, some of the front covers were also revised otherwise; for example, the "NOW?" on the cover of Where's Wally Now? was given a 2D effect, but it was originally designed to look like a 3D shape.

Other books
In addition to the primary books, other books have also been published in the Wally franchise. The first alternate-format Wally book was the Ultimate Fun Book. In addition to standard Wally scenes, this paperback activity book featured other types of games and activities, as well as cardboard punch-outs and stickers. The Magnificent Poster Book, which was a large-format book of posters including five scenes from past books and six new scenes (later included in The Great Picture Hunt).
 Where's Wally? The Ultimate Fun Book (1990)
 Activity book
 Where's Wally? The Magnificent Poster Book (1991)
 Larger book containing cut-out posters
 Where's Wally? The Dazzling Deep-sea Divers Sticker Book  (1994)
 Sticker book and play scene
 Where's Wally? The Fabulous Flying Carpets Sticker Book (1994)
 Sticker book and play scene
 A Where's Wally? Fun Fact Book: Plundering Pirates (2000)
 Educational Where's Wally? book with new scenes and facts
 A Where's Wally? Fun Fact Book: Fighting Knights (2000)
 Educational Where's Wally? book with new scenes and facts
 Where's Wally? (2008)
 A £1 World Book Day Book
 Where's Wally? The Spectacular Poster Book (2010)
 Larger book containing cut-out posters
 Where's Wally? The Search for the Lost Things (2012)
 Where's Wally? 25th Anniversary Annual (2012)

Several other "activity books" have also been published featuring art from the "Where's Wally" comic strip:
 Where's Wally? The Truly Terrific Activity Book (1993)
 Where's Wally? The Absolutely Amazing Activity Book (1993)
 Where's Wally? The Wildly Wonderful Activity Book (1994)
 Where's Wally? Simply Sensational Activity Book (1994)
 Where's Wally? The Really Remarkable Activity Book (1995)
 Where's Wally? The Completely Crazy Activity Book (1995)
 Where's Wally? Bumper Activity Book (1995) - previous four books in one volume.

The first six activity books mentioned were reprinted in 2009 in a smaller size with different packaging.

Collections

Publication details
 As of 2022, only the special editions of the original five books are still in print, as well as a paperback 2007 reprint of The Great Picture Hunt and a paperback 2010 reprint of The Incredible Paper Chase. These books now also have "Special extra searches inside", according to the front covers.
 1997's The Wonder Book was the last numbered book in the series to contain new, original scenes, as The Great Picture Hunt and The Incredible Paper Chase contain both new scenes and older ones from The Ultimate Fun Book and The Magnificent Poster Book, as these books are no longer in print.
 The scene originally titled "Among the Pirates" is the most used, as it has appeared in 1991's The Magnificent Poster Book, 2000's Plundering Pirates, 2006's The Great Picture Hunt, and a jigsaw puzzle.

Magazine
A series of geographical magazines for children was published in the United Kingdom, Ukraine, Ireland, Australia, New Zealand, South Africa, Portugal, Poland, Brazil, Spain, France, Hungary, Czech Republic, Malta, Bulgaria and Russia, called Wally's World. In each issue Wally travelled to a different country or region of the world giving the reader interesting facts. 52 issues were published from January 1997 to January 1998, when Wally's History of the World began, focusing more on history than geography. The first issue was given away free with the last issue of Wally's World.

Television series

A 13-episode animated series, Where's Wally?, with Townsend Coleman as the voice of Wally, was produced by DiC for CBS in 1991 for the North American market under the "Waldo" name. The show was later translated for international markets – usually renaming the character to match the books of that country. The dialogue and theme song were recorded in alternative Wally versions, with the same voice cast of the original US production, in order to market the show in the UK. It was aired on ITV in the UK and the distribution rights to the show are currently held by HIT Entertainment.

A new animated series by DreamWorks Animation Television aired on Universal Kids in 2019. The voice cast includes Joshua Rush as the voice of Waldo, Haley Tju as Wenda, Eva Carlton as Odlulu (the female equivalent to Odlaw), Thomas Lennon as Wizard Whitebeard and Ian James Corlett as Woof. The series later moved to Peacock.

Film
A film based on the Where's Wally? series of books has been pursued by various studios. Nickelodeon was the one of the studios to take an interest in the idea but when the regime at Paramount (Nickelodeon's corporate sister) changed, the project was cancelled. In June 2009, Universal Studios (who would later obtain ownership of the property through its acquisition of Classic Media's owner DreamWorks Animation in 2016) and Illumination Entertainment had acquired the rights to turn Where's Wally? into a live-action film, but the project was also cancelled.

In November 2011, Metro-Goldwyn-Mayer and Classic Media announced a live-action film based on the Where's Wally? series. Screenwriter Todd Berger has been hired to write the story for the film, which was slated to be released in the summer of 2015. In March 2016, Seth Rogen and Evan Goldberg were in talks to produce the film with their producing partner James Weaver and Kyle Hunter and Ariel Shaffir to write the film, under their Point Grey Pictures banner.

The 1994 comedy film Naked Gun : The Final Insult, starring Leslie Nielsen and Priscilla Presley, features a cameo appearance by Wally at the end of the film during a scene that takes place at the Academy Awards.

During the 2012 Super Bowl, Wally was featured in a MetLife commercial. As in the series, Wally was hard to find in the commercial.

Video games
A number of North American video games were developed using the US/Canada regional name "Waldo":
 Where's Waldo? (1991) (NES)
 The Great Waldo Search (1992) (NES, SNES, Mega Drive)
 Wally wo Sagase! (1992) (Arcade) (Japan-exclusive title developed and published by Sega)
 Wally wo Sagase! Ehon no Kuni no Daibouken (1993) (Super Famicom) (Japan-exclusive title published by Tomy)
 Where's Waldo at the Circus (1995) (PC)
 Where's Waldo?: Exploring Geography (1996) (PC)
 Where's Waldo? The Fantastic Journey (2009) (PC, Mac, Nintendo Wii, Nintendo DS, iPhone, iPad, iPod Touch)
 Where's Waldo? in Hollywood (2010) (iPhone, iPad, iPod Touch)
 Waldo & Friends, a mobile game published by Ludia, Inc. on iOS and Android in 2015, but is no longer available for download

Comic strip

For several years in the early and mid-1990s, Where's Wally? was turned into a Sunday newspaper comic/puzzle, distributed by King Features Syndicate. The strip was later translated and reworked for international markets, including releases in book form in the US, using the regional name 'Waldo'.

Several activity books of the comic strip were released in the mid-1990s:
 Where's Wally: The Completely Crazy Activity Book
 Where's Wally: The Really Remarkable Activity Book
 Where's Wally: The Simply Sensational Activity Book
 Where's Wally: The Wildly Wonderful Activity Book

Cereal boxes
In the early 1990s Quaker Life Cereal in the US carried various Where's Waldo? scenes on the back of the boxes along with collector's cards, toys and send-away prizes.

This was shown in The Simpsons episode "Hello Gutter, Hello Fadder" where Homer shouts "Waldo, where are you?!" after looking at the scene on the cereal box as Waldo walks by the kitchen window.

Google Maps
On 1 April 2018, Google Maps added a minigame in which one can look for Wally and his friends around the world – in the Andes (Chile), Surfers Paradise beach (Australia), in the Pyeongchang Olympic Stadium (South Korea), at the La Tomatina festival (Spain), in Hollywood and in the Picard crater on the Moon.

Real-life Where's Wally? phenomena

World record attempts

In 2009, 1,052 students, alumni, and members of the community at Rutgers University in New Brunswick, New Jersey, captured the Guinness World Record for the largest gathering of people dressed as Wally. The event raised money for local public schools.

In 2011, the previous record was broken when 3,872 people dressed as Wally gathered in Merrion Square, Dublin, Ireland.

The record was beaten in 2017 when 4,626 people dressed as Wally gathered in Japan, after three failed attempts.

The Waldo Waldo 5K has tried to break the record in a 5-kilometre fun run to raise money for the Waldo Canyon Fire burn area in Colorado Springs, Colorado, US, every year since the fire in July 2012. The first attempt, on 21 October, had just over a thousand. The second attempt, on 27 October 2013, had over 2,700. The third attempt, on 26 October 2014, hosted 3,104 participants. The fourth attempt, on 17 October 2015, increased the count to 3,400 participants. The fifth attempt was made on 22 October 2016, with a final count of 3,524. The next race was held on 21 October 2017.

Real-life re-creation
On 12 September 2009, a re-creation took place in downtown Chicago. The re-creation featured all of the characters, Wally, Wenda, Wizard Whitebeard, Odlaw, and Woof, hiding throughout downtown Chicago and invited others to come and find them.
Universities (such as the University of Exeter) have had Where's Wally inspired societies, in which members may dress as Wally whilst playing games such as hide-and-seek on campus grounds.

See also

References

 
Book series introduced in 1987
British picture books
Puzzle books
Literary characters introduced in 1987
1980s fads and trends
1990s fads and trends
Tomy games
British novels adapted into television shows
1987 neologisms
Quotations from literature
Series of children's books
Walker Books books